The Southern Hockey League (abbreviated SHL) is a defunct low-level professional ice hockey league.

It operated in the United States for one season, 1995–1996, with teams in the southeastern United States. It was originally named the Sunshine Hockey League, but changed its name after expanding outside of Florida. The league only played one season. The Huntsville Channel Cats, along with the planned 1996–97 expansion teams Columbus Cottonmouths, Macon Whoopee, and Nashville Nighthawks, joined the Central Hockey League following the SHL's demise.

Final standings

Regular season

Playoffs

External links
1995-96 Southern Hockey League Standings at HockeyDB.com

 
Defunct ice hockey leagues in the United States
1995–96 in American ice hockey by league